Tilgul is a colourful sesame candy coated with sesame seeds; in Maharashtra people exchange tilgul on Sankranti, a Hindu festival celebrated on 14 January, which continue till Rathsaptami, till 7 days.

Due to Sesame and Jageery, this candy is healthy for human body during winter season.  That's why this candy exchange festival is in winter.

The sweet is a mixture of sesame seeds (called "Til" in Marathi) and jaggery (called "Gul" in Marathi) and hence the name. On Sankranti eve, families serve their guests with Tilgul or Tilgul sweets while saying "Tilgul ghya, goad goad bola" which literally means "Take Tilgul and talk sweetly".

See also
 List of sesame seed dishes

External links
Recipe

Indian desserts
Maharashtrian cuisine
Indian confectionery
Sesame dishes